Understand? is the fourth album by Chicago post-hardcore band Naked Raygun, released in 1989 through Caroline Records.

Track listing

Personnel 
Naked Raygun
John Haggerty – guitar
Pierre Kezdy – bass guitar
Jeff Pezzati – vocals
Eric Spicer – drums
Production and additional personnel
Phil Hale – illustrations
Marc Harris – photography
Ellie Hughes – design
Tom Hughes – design
Naked Raygun – production
Larry Sturm – production

References

External links 
 

1989 albums
Caroline Records albums
Naked Raygun albums